Gulfoceras is an extinct genus of rhinoceros endemic to North America from the Miocene, living from 23.03 to 20.4 mya existing for approximately .

Taxonomy
Gulfoceras was named by Albright (1999). Its type is Gulfoceras westfalli. It was assigned to Rhinocerotidae by Albright (1999).

References

Miocene rhinoceroses
Miocene mammals of North America